Maria Krüger (1904–1999) was a Polish children’s literature writer and journalist. Krüger participated in the Warsaw Uprising. Several of her children’s books received radio and television adaptations, and have been required reading in Polish schools.

Daughter of author Edmund Krüger and Aniela Paulina Krüger (née Dobosiewicz), older sister of director and animator Halina Bielińska.

Selected works:
 Karolcia (1959)
 Godzina pąsowej róży (1960)
 The Nutcracker (1967)
 Witaj, Karolciu (1970)

References

 Współcześni polscy pisarze i badacze literatury. Słownik biobibliograficzny, T. 4, pod red. J. Czachowskiej, A. Szałagan. Warszawa: WSiP, 1996, p. 388. .

1904 births
1999 deaths
Polish children's writers
Polish women children's writers
20th-century Polish writers
Warsaw Uprising insurgents
20th-century Polish women writers
Women in World War II